Richard Musukwa (born 28 November 1970) is a Zambian politician. He served as Member of the National Assembly for Wusakile and Chililabombwe from 2011 to 2021. He also served as Deputy Minister of Mines, Energy and Water Development from 2015 to 2016, and as Minister of Mines and Minerals Development from 2018 to 2021.

Biography
Prior to entering politics Musukwa worked as a teacher, miner and trade unionist.

He was chosen as Patriotic Front candidate for Wusakile for the 2016 general elections and was subsequently elected to the National Assembly with a 14,851-vote majority. In February 2015 he was appointed Deputy Minister of Mines, Energy and Water Development.

Prior to the 2016 general elections, Musukwa was chosen as the Patriotic Front in Chililabombwe, and was re-elected with a 6,159-vote majority. Following the elections he was appointed Chief Whip of the Patriotic Front government. In February 2018 he was made Minister of Mines and Minerals Development. He lost his seat in the 2021 general elections.

References

1970 births
Living people
Zambian educators
Zambian miners
Zambian trade unionists
Patriotic Front (Zambia) politicians
Members of the National Assembly of Zambia
Mines ministers of Zambia